The prpl Foundation is a non-profit open source software Foundation started by Imagination Technologies and others to encourage use of the MIPS architecture (and “open to others”), through the promotion of standards and open source solutions, with a particular focus on equipment for data centers, networking, and devices for the Internet of Things.

The Foundation manages projects in specific topic areas via “PEGs” (prpl Engineer Groups), including groups focused on processor emulation (QEMU), carrier-grade networking (prplOS, based on OpenWRT), and virtualization and security.  The organization also collects and disseminates information of interest to its members, including patterns in consumer use of smart devices and security issues. In 2016 the organization released a study, "The prpl Foundation Smart Home Security Report".  The group also finds and reports security issues in smart devices.

Members of prpl include: Verizon, Orange, Vodafone, Broadcom, Cavium, Ikanos, Imagination Technologies, Ineda Systems, Ingenic Semiconductor, MaxLinear, Nevales Networks, PMC-Sierra, and Qualcomm. The security PEG includes several of the above, as well as CUPP Computing, Elliptic Technologies, Imperas Software, Kernkonzept, and Seltech.

References

External links

 Open source software supported by prpl Foundation

Computer science organizations
MIPS architecture